Abu Jaʿfar An-Nahhas (died 949 AD / AH 338) was an Egyptian Muslim scholar of grammar and Qur'anic exegete during the
10th-century Abbasid period. His full name was Abū Jaʿfar Ahmad Ibn Muhammad Ibn Ismail Ibn Yūnus al-Murādi, surnamed an-Nahhās "copper-worker" (a term for artisans who make brass vessels).

Life 
Abu Jaʿfar An-Nahhas—whose full name was Abū Jaʿfar Ahmad Ibn Muhammad Ibn Ismail Ibn Yūnus al-Murādi, surnamed an-Nahhās "copper-worker" (a term for artisans who make brass vessels)—was born in Fustat, he studied in Baghdad under the foremost grammarians of the period like al-Zajjāj who familiarised him with the Kitāb by the famed grammarian Sībawayh (d. c.180/796). He also studied philology with ʿAlī b. Sulaymān al-Akhfash al-Aṣghar (d. 315/927) and Nifṭawayh (d. 323/935). He is the author of an influential work on abrogation, Al-Nasīkh wal-Mansūkh.  He wrote a treatise on the grammatical analysis of the Qur'an and a grammatical primer known as "The Apple" (التفاحة at-Tuffāha), besides works on poetry, including a commentary on the Mu'allaqat.

Death 
He was killed as he was reciting poetry sitting on the banks of the Nile in Cairo, as a passing peasant thought he was uttering a charm to prevent the rise of the Nile, "so as to raise the price of provisions" and threw him into the river  causing him to drown.

References 

 Mac Guckin de Slane,  (trans.), Ibn Khallikan's Biographical Dictionary, vol. 1, Paris, 1843, p. 81.
 Louis Moréri, Le grand dictionnaire historique (1759), Abou-Giafar al Nahas

949 deaths
Year of birth unknown
Scholars from the Abbasid Caliphate
Arab grammarians
Medieval grammarians of Arabic